Interference microscopy involving measurements of differences in the path between two beams of light that have been split.

Types include:
 Classical interference microscopy
 Differential interference contrast microscopy
 Fluorescence interference contrast microscopy
 Interference reflection microscopy

See also
 Phase contrast microscopy

References

Microscopy